The Challenge Emiliano Sala is an annual friendly football competition played in honour of Argentine footballer Emiliano Sala, who died on 21 January 2019 in a plane crash. The participating clubs in the first edition in 2021 were Girondins de Bordeaux, Stade Malherbe Caen, FC Nantes, and Chamois Niortais, all former clubs of Sala.

History 
The Challenge Emiliano Sala is organized by the Un jour meilleur association founded by former US Orléans defender Cédric Cambon with the support of the city of Orléans. The inspiration for the creation of the competition came from Thomas Renault, sports assistant in the town of Orléans and former US Orléans goalkeeper who played alongside Emiliano Sala at USO.

For each ticket sold to matches of the competition, one euro is donated to the Emiliano Sala solidarity fund, started by Cardiff City, who had signed him from Nantes shortly before his death. The rest of each ticket's price is given to the Un jour meilleur association. A charity gala and an auction of football kits are also organized during the three days of the tournament in order to raise funds.

The first edition of the tournament took place from 16 to 18 July 2021 at the Stade de la Source in Orléans. The first semi-final was played between Nantes and Caen, and the second semi-final was played between Niort and Bordeaux. Caen eliminated Nantes with a 1–0 win thanks to a goal from Yoann Court, and Bordeaux won against Niort in a penalty shoot-out (5–3) after a 1–1 draw in which Jimmy Briand opened the scoring for Les Girondins and Guy Kilama equalized for Les Chamois. On 18 July, Nantes and Niort played in the third place playoff the Challenge Emiliano Sala. Niort won the match, securing third place in the competition thanks to a goal from Mathis Ansar. The final of the first edition of the tournament was therefore played between Caen and Bordeaux, a game in which Bordeaux was victorious by a score of 2–1. Caen opened the scoring with a goal from Vladislav Molchan, but goals from Rémi Oudin and Sékou Mara secured the win for FCGB. Bordeaux therefore won the first edition of the Challenge Emiliano Sala.

The second edition of the Challenge Emiliano Sala was scheduled to take place 16–17 July 2022, with the participating teams being Bordeaux, Caen, Nantes, and Orléans. However, the competition was cancelled after Nantes pulled out on 6 July. The club’s head coach, Antoine Kombouaré, explained the decision by saying, "Between the demotion of Bordeaux [to the Championnat National] and this limited workforce, I had to make this decision."

Past winners

References

External links 

 Official website
French football friendly trophies
2021 establishments in France
Recurring sporting events established in 2021